Tinwald is a town in Canterbury, New Zealand, now little more than a suburb of Ashburton. It lies to the south of the larger town, separated from it by the Ashburton River / Hakatere. The town was named after Tinwald Downs in Scotland, birthplace of an early European resident and owner of much of the land, Robert Wilkin.

Prominent former citizens of Tinwald include William Massey, who was Prime Minister of New Zealand from 1912 to 1925.

The Main South Line section of the South Island Main Trunk Railway runs through Tinwald, and from 1878 until 1968, the town acted as the junction for the Mount Somers Branch.  The first 2.5 kilometres of the branch line at the Tinwald end are now preserved by The Plains Vintage Railway & Historical Museum, who regularly operate public open days.  The Railway is particularly notable for K 88, a locomotive recovered in 19 and 20 January 1974 from where it was dumped in the Ōreti River and returned to full operating condition in 1982.  It still operates services on The Plains Railway today.

Tinwald has several shops spanning its main road including several cafés, a tavern, a supermarket and its own liquor store.

History
Tinwald began in 1873 when Robert Wilkin purchased 900 acres as a base for dealing in stock throughout the area. He named it Tinwald Downs after his Scottish birthplace.

Demographics

Tinwald, comprising the statistical areas of Tinwald North and Tinwald South, had a population of 3,558 at the 2018 New Zealand census, an increase of 312 people (9.6%) since the 2013 census, and an increase of 564 people (18.8%) since the 2006 census. There were 1,386 households. There were 1,779 males and 1,776 females, giving a sex ratio of 1.0 males per female, with 675 people (19.0%) aged under 15 years, 654 (18.4%) aged 15 to 29, 1,500 (42.2%) aged 30 to 64, and 732 (20.6%) aged 65 or older.

Ethnicities were 87.5% European/Pākehā, 9.2% Māori, 4.6% Pacific peoples, 4.4% Asian, and 1.5% other ethnicities (totals add to more than 100% since people could identify with multiple ethnicities).

The proportion of people born overseas was 13.1%, compared with 27.1% nationally.

Although some people objected to giving their religion, 48.8% had no religion, 40.4% were Christian, 0.4% were Hindu, 0.3% were Muslim, 0.3% were Buddhist and 1.6% had other religions.

Of those at least 15 years old, 219 (7.6%) people had a bachelor or higher degree, and 870 (30.2%) people had no formal qualifications. The employment status of those at least 15 was that 1,464 (50.8%) people were employed full-time, 435 (15.1%) were part-time, and 87 (3.0%) were unemployed.

Education
Tinwald School is a coeducational state contributing primary school (years 1-6). It has a roll of  students as of  It first opened in 1879.

References

External links
Plains Vintage Railway

Populated places in Canterbury, New Zealand
Suburbs of Ashburton